5α-Dihydronorethisterone (5α-DHNET, dihydronorethisterone, 17α-ethynyl-5α-dihydro-19-nortestosterone, or 17α-ethynyl-5α-estran-17β-ol-3-one) is a major active metabolite of norethisterone (norethindrone). Norethisterone is a progestin with additional weak androgenic and estrogenic activity. 5α-DHNET is formed from norethisterone by 5α-reductase in the liver and other tissues.

Unlike norethisterone which is purely progestogenic, 5α-DHNET has been found to possess both progestogenic and marked antiprogestogenic activity, showing a profile of progestogenic activity like that of a selective progesterone receptor modulator (SPRM). Moreover, the affinity of 5α-DHNET for the progesterone receptor (PR) is greatly reduced relative to that of norethisterone at only 25% of that of progesterone (versus 150% for norethisterone).

5α-DHNET shows higher affinity for the androgen receptor (AR) compared to norethisterone with approximately 27% of the affinity of the potent androgen metribolone (versus 15% for norethisterone). However, although 5α-DHNET has higher affinity for the AR than does norethisterone, it has significantly diminished and in fact almost abolished androgenic activity in comparison to norethisterone in rodent bioassays. Similar findings were observed for ethisterone (17α-ethynyltestosterone) and its 5α-reduced metabolite, whereas 5α-reduction enhanced both the AR affinity and androgenic potency of testosterone and nandrolone (19-nortestosterone) in rodent bioassays. As such, it appears that the C17α ethynyl group of norethisterone is responsible for its loss of androgenicity upon 5α-reduction. Instead of androgenic activity, 5α-DHNET has been reported to possess some antiandrogenic activity.

Norethisterone and 5α-DHNET have been found to act as weak irreversible aromatase inhibitors (Ki = 1.7 μM and 9.0 μM, respectively). However, the concentrations required are probably too high to be clinically relevant at typical dosages of norethisterone. 5α-DHNET specifically has been assessed and found to be selective in its inhibition of aromatase, and does not affect other steroidogenesis enzymes such as cholesterol side-chain cleavage enzyme (P450scc), 17α-hydroxylase/17,20-lyase, 21-hydroxylase, or 11β-hydroxylase. Since it is not aromatized (and hence cannot be transformed into an estrogenic metabolite), unlike norethisterone, 5α-DHNET has been proposed as a potential therapeutic agent in the treatment of estrogen receptor (ER)-positive breast cancer.

See also
 5α-Dihydroethisterone
 5α-Dihydronandrolone
 5α-Dihydronormethandrone
 5α-Dihydrolevonorgestrel

References

5α-Reduced steroid metabolites
Ethynyl compounds
Androgens and anabolic steroids
Aromatase inhibitors
Estranes
Human drug metabolites
Ketones
Selective progesterone receptor modulators